The Supreme Soviet of the Armenian SSR was the supreme soviet (main legislative institution) of the Armenian Soviet Socialist Republic (from July 1938), and the independent Republic of Armenia, from 23 August 1990 until 1995 when it was superseded by the National Assembly, with the adoption of the Armenian Constitution.

The Supreme Council was preceded by the Armenian National Council (1917-1918) and then a Khorhurd (legislature), before Armenia became part of the Soviet Union in 1920.

Convocations
1st convocation (1938–1946)
2nd convocation (1947–1950)
3rd convocation (1951–1954)
4th convocation (1955–1959)
5th convocation (1959–1962)
6th convocation (1963–1966)
7th convocation (1967–1970)
8th convocation (1971–1974)
9th convocation (1975–1979)
10th convocation (1980–1984)
11th convocation (1985–1989)
12th convocation (1990–1995)

Notable members
Members included:
Levon Ter-Petrosyan, President of the Supreme Council of the Republic of Armenia at the time of nation's independence in 1990 
Serzh Sargsyan
Karapet Rubinyan
Ara Sahakian, secretary in 1990 when he signed the Declaration of Independence of Armenia with president Ter-Petrosyan
Samand Siabandov

References

Armenian Soviet Socialist Republic
Government of Armenia
1938 establishments in Armenia
1995 disestablishments in Armenia
Defunct unicameral legislatures
Armenian